The MSI World Scrabble Championship 2017 was a Scrabble tournament organised by Mattel and Mindsports International (MSI) to determine the world champion in English Scrabble. It was held from 22 to 27 August in Nottinghamshire, England.

The event was split into two divisions according to players' World English-Language Scrabble Players' Association (WESPA) ratings; the top division comprised some 77 players. 35 games were played on the first four days, after which the top eight proceeded to a 3-game quarterfinals, with the winners advancing to a 5-game semifinals on the same day; the top two players, David Eldar and Harshan Lamabadusuriya, played a best-of-five final the day after for the top prize of €7,000. Eldar beat Lamabadusuriya 3–0.

Background
The World Scrabble Championship 2017 was originally slated to take place at the Doha Exhibition and Convention Center in Qatar, as part of the 4th Mindsports World Championship (comprising chess, go, e-sports, and Scrabble events) organised by the Mindsports Academy (MSA). However, due to the 2017 Qatar diplomatic crisis, the championship was relocated to Nottingham Trent University in Nottingham, Nottinghamshire, England, and held from 22 to 27 August under the auspices of Mindsports International (the parent organisation of MSA) and sponsored by Mattel, the Qatar Tourism Authority, SamTimer, and the World Mind Sport Federation. MSA also hosted a Junior World Scrabble Championship for players under 21 at the same venue from 19 to 21 August.

Results

Preliminary
After 35 preliminary rounds, the top eight, which included three-time World Champion Nigel Richards (2007, 2011, and 2013) and 1993 champion Mark Nyman, advanced to the quarterfinals. 2016 champion Brett Smitheram finished in fourteenth place, thus failing in his title defence.

Source:

Knockout

Source:

Finals

Source:

UK-based poker player and real estate agent David Eldar, who was born in Australia, whitewashed Sri Lankan doctor Harshan Lamabadusuriya in the best-of-five finals; Eldar was awarded £7000 for becoming 2017 World Scrabble Champion, whereas runner-up Lamabadusuriya netted £3000. Notable plays by Eldar included CARRELS for 74 points, ASINICOS (idiots; 64), and OBVS (slang for obvious; 10). Austin Shin beat Goutham Jayaraman 2–1 in a best-of-three third-place playoff.

References

2017
2017 in English sport
August 2017 sports events in Europe
2010s in Nottingham
August 2017 events in the United Kingdom